Roderick Shoate (April 26, 1953 – October 4, 1999) was an American football linebacker in the National Football League (NFL). He was a four-time All-Big 8 Conference Player and a three-time All-American at the University of Oklahoma. He played seven seasons in the NFL for the New England Patriots, and then in the United States Football League (USFL) for the New Jersey Generals and Memphis Showboats.

Shoate, who died in 1999 after a long illness, was elected posthumously to the College Football Hall of Fame. in 2013.

Former coaches and teammates attribute Shoate's speed, attention to detail, and relentless pursuit of the other team to his success as a player.

References

1953 births
1999 deaths
All-American college football players
American football linebackers
College Football Hall of Fame inductees
Memphis Showboats players
New England Patriots players
New Jersey Generals players
Oklahoma Sooners football players
People from Spiro, Oklahoma
Players of American football from Oklahoma